KMR may refer to:

KMR Racing Team, a motorcycle racing team
KMR Communications, a company founded by Katherine Rothman
Kent Music Report, an Australian former record chart
Klondike Mines Railway, a railway in Yukon, Canada
Karimui Airport, an airport in Papua New Guinea (IATA code: KMR)
Northern Kurdish or Kurmanji, a group of Kurdish dialects (ISO 639-3 code: kmr)